Nevaton is a Russian manufacturer of studio, film and broadcast microphones, headquartered in St. Petersburg. The company's name is derived from the Neva River, which flows through the city.

History

LOMO
The roots of Nevaton date back to 1947, when an acoustic laboratory was established at the Leningrad Optical and Mechanical 
Association (LOMO) in St. Petersburg. In 1954, the laboratory joined the newly formed scientific and industrial association, named EKRAN.
Until 1987, this laboratory did research and design for microphones for the Soviet film, broadcast and defense industries. Notable microphones from this era include the LOMO 19A19.

Nevaton
In 1991, Nevaton LTD Enterprise was founded entirely by former LOMO engineers as a new and independent microphone manufacturer and research laboratory.

The Nevaton facility in St. Petersburg contains a well-equipped acoustic laboratory, including one of Europe's largest anechoic chambers, as well as a small specialized factory where each microphone is hand-assembled by engineers. All microphone components, including brass housings, capsules, and XLR connectors, are manufactured in-house.

Nevaton microphones are individually tuned, and tested and measured with Brüel & Kjær equipment. The microphones run through several testing routines before they are delivered to customers.  On average, only 15 units leave the factory each month.

The famous film studios Lenfilm and Mosfilm, theatres and opera houses like the Mariinsky Theatre, St. Petersburg Philharmonic Orchestra, Moscow New Opera, TV and radio stations are Nevaton's regular customers as well as major sound-production studios.

Nevaton's product catalog includes stereo microphones, small-diaphragm condensers, middle and large-diaphragm condensers, tube microphones, boundary-layer, shotgun microphones and high quality miniature microphones.

See also
List of microphone manufacturers

External links 
 Official Website
 Nevaton Review/SoundOnSound Magazine
 Website of Nevaton/Europe
 Website of Nevaton/USA

Microphone manufacturers
Audio equipment manufacturers of Russia
Manufacturing companies based in Saint Petersburg
Russian brands